The 2011 Louisiana–Lafayette Ragin' Cajuns softball team represented the University of Louisiana at Lafayette in the 2011 NCAA Division I softball season. The Ragin' Cajuns played their home games at Lamson Park and were led by eleventh and twelfth year husband and wife head coach duo Michael and Stenfi Lotief, respectively.

Preseason

Sun Belt Conference Coaches Poll
The Sun Belt Conference Coaches Poll was released on February 7, 2011. Louisiana-Lafayette was picked to finish first in the Sun Belt Conference with 80 votes and 8 first place votes

Preseason All-Sun Belt team
Ashley Brignac (ULL, JR, Pitcher)
Ashlyn Williams (TROY, SR, Pitcher)
Kerri Croney (FAU, SR, Catcher)
Gabriele Bridges (ULL, SR, 1st Base)
Brie Rojas (FIU, SO, 2nd Base)
Nerissa Myers (ULL, SO, Shortstop)
Jessy Alfonso (FIU, SO, 3rd Base)
Ashley McClain (FIU, JR, Outfield)
Christi Orgeron (ULL, JR, Outfield)
Brianna Love (ULM, SR, Outfield)
Mallorie Sulaski (WKU, SO, Designated Player)

Roster

Coaching staff

Schedule and results

Austin Regional

References

Louisiana
Louisiana Ragin' Cajuns softball seasons
Louisiana softball